Saxifraga sect. Cotylea is a section in the genus Saxifraga.

References 

cotylea
Plant sections